Batcham is a town and commune in Cameroon. It is located in the  Bamboutos department, in the West region. The commune was created by decree in 1962. The Batcham municipality has two First Class chiefdoms (Bangang and Batcham) one Second Class chiefdom, (Bamougong) and approximately 165 Third class chieftaincies.

The department covers an area of 185  km2 and a total population of 160 000.

See also
Communes of Cameroon

References

 Site de la primature - Élections municipales 2002 
 Contrôle de gestion et performance des services publics communaux des villes camerounaises - Thèse de Donation Avele, Université Montesquieu Bordeaux IV 
 Charles Nanga, La réforme de l’administration territoriale au Cameroun à la lumière de la loi constitutionnelle n° 96/06 du 18 janvier 1996, Mémoire ENA. 

Populated places in West Region (Cameroon)
Communes of Cameroon